Evergreen High School is a public high school in the Highline School District and located in White Center, an unincorporated area of King County, Washington. The school's mascot is the Wolverine.

Currently the principal is Simón Iñiguez.

Small Schools
In 2007, Evergreen High School was closed and replaced by three small high schools, which was part of a district-wide effort (originally funded by the Bill and Melinda Gates Foundation) to increase student achievement levels. The three small schools were named: Technology, Engineering & Communications School (TEC), Health Sciences & Human Services High School (HS3), and Arts & Academics Academy (AAA). Beginning in the 2017–2018 school year, the small schools were disbanded and the campus was re-unified as Evergreen High School.

Athletics
Evergreen's sports teams are known as the Wolverines. Their colors are green and white.

Formerly members of the now defunct Seamount League, Evergreen is a member of the Mountain Division of the 2A South Puget Sound League since the 2016–17 school year.
Evergeen was the 1968 North Puget Sound League Basketball champion, and finished 3rd in the State Basketball Championship.

From 1969–1982, the WIAA Boys State Cross Country Championships were held at Evergreen High School.  The WIAA Girls State Cross Country Championships were held at the Evergreen course from 1976 to 1982.

Notable alumni
Jack Thompson – Class of 1974 – Quarterback for Washington State University and played in the NFL from 1979 to 1984.
Senio Kelemete – Class of 2008 – Offensive Tackle for University of Washington and former Arizona Cardinals and New Orleans Saints player. He is currently playing for the Houston Texans, as of 2018.

References

External links
Highline School District
The Seattle Times: School Guide
AAA – OSPI School Report Card 2010–11
HS3 – OSPI School Report Card 2010–11
TEC – OSPI School Report Card 2010–11

High schools in King County, Washington
Public high schools in Washington (state)
1959 establishments in Washington (state)
Educational institutions established in 1959